Red Hill Creek is a  long 2nd order tributary to the Fisher River in Surry County, North Carolina.

Course
Red Hill Creek rises on the Potters Creek divide about 1 mile west-southwest of Raven Knob.  Red Hill Creek then flows south and then curves northeast to join the Fisher River about 0.5 miles southeast of Blevins Store, North Carolina.

Watershed
Red Hill Creek drains  of area, receives about 49.0 in/year of precipitation, has a wetness index of 315.14, and is about 82% forested.

See also
List of rivers of North Carolina

References

Rivers of North Carolina
Rivers of Surry County, North Carolina